Shuyang railway station is a railway station in Shuyang County, Suqian, Jiangsu, China. It opened on 25 June 2005.

References

Railway stations in Jiangsu
Railway stations in China opened in 2005